Senator Groff may refer to:

Peter Groff (born 1963), Colorado State Senate
Regis Groff (1935–2014), Colorado State Senate